Ramona Falls is a waterfall on the upper Sandy River on the west side of Mount Hood, Oregon, United States.

References 

Waterfalls of Oregon
Landforms of Clackamas County, Oregon
Mount Hood National Forest
Waterfalls of Clackamas County, Oregon